"Halka" is a song by Swedish alternative rock band Kent, released on 29 April 1996 as the second single from their second studio album, Verkligen. The CD single contains the two b-sides, "Att presentera ett svin" and "Gummiband", which were later released on the compilation B-sidor 95–00 in 2000. These two tracks were recorded, produced and mixed by Kent and Heikki Kiviaho.

The song peaked at #36 in Sweden, their lowest chart position to date.

Track listing

Charts

References

1996 singles
Kent (band) songs
Songs written by Joakim Berg
1996 songs
RCA Victor singles